Hirzai or Nukra is a rare breed of riding horse originating from Pakistan.
These horses are of Arab origin and have ample resemblance to Baluchis. Their size is intermediate between those of a horse and a pony. Thoroughbred stallions provided by the Balochistan Government at important centers such as Quetta and Sibi are instrumental in large scale crossbreeding with native mares. The objective is to improve the native stock, however, this policy has led to the deterioration of native breeds purity. Good specimens of Balochi and Hirzai breeds are available at Sibi and Nasirabad Horse shows. These horses are found in all provinces of Pakistan.

History

According to Pakistan's Agricultural Department, the original stock of the Hirzai breed is said to have been derived from a mare owned by the Rind chief named Shol, by an Arabian stallion belonging to a European military officer who accompanied the contingent of Shah Shujah al-Mulk through Shoran in the first Anglo-Afghan War of 1839. Representative animals are still owned by His highness Suleman Dawood Khan of Kalat.

Characteristics

The predominant colour of the Hirzai is gray. The head is handsome with a broad forehead; the neck is medium in length, muscular, and arched; the body is compact with a short back and well-muscled loins; the croup is level; the shoulders are well sloped and powerful; the forearms are strong, but the legs lack bone. This is a horse of strength, good conformation, and stamina and it can used for hard and fast work.

References

 Hendricks, Bonnie. International Encyclopedia of Horse Breeds, page 223
 http://agrihunt.com/articles/livestock-industry/horse-breeds/

Horse breeds
Horse breeds originating in Pakistan